Luca Mazzone (born 3 May 1971) is an Italian paralympic cyclist and before para swimmer who won eight medals at the Summer Paralympics (3 gold and 3 silver in cycling, 2 silver in swimmimg).

Career
He competed in five Paralympics, three in Swimming (2000, 2004, 2008) and two in Cycling (2016, 2020). He also won 18 world titles in cycling.

See also
 Italy at the 2000 Summer Paralympics - Medalists
 Italy at the 2016 Summer Paralympics - Medalists
 Italy at the 2020 Summer Paralympics - Medalists

References

External links
 
 Luca Mazzone at Olympics.com

1971 births
Living people
Paralympic cyclists of Italy
Paralympic gold medalists for Italy
Paralympic silver medalists for Italy
Paralympic bronze medalists for Italy
Medalists at the 2000 Summer Paralympics
Medalists at the 2016 Summer Paralympics
Medalists at the 2020 Summer Paralympics
Paralympic medalists in swimming
Paralympic medalists in cycling
Swimmers at the 2000 Summer Paralympics
Swimmers at the 2004 Summer Paralympics
Swimmers at the 2008 Summer Paralympics
Cyclists at the 2016 Summer Paralympics
Cyclists at the 2020 Summer Paralympics
Medalists at the World Para Swimming Championships
Paralympic swimmers of Italy
20th-century Italian people
21st-century Italian people